Charlton Media Group is a publisher of business-focused media in Asia. Its managing director and editor-in-chief is Tim Charlton. In 2003, the company acquired the publishing rights of five magazines: Asian Power, Energy International, Asian Communications, Middle East Communications and Middle East Broadcast & Satellite.

Publications
 Singapore Business Review
 Hong Kong Business
 Asian Banking & Finance
 Asian Power
 Investment Asia
 Health Care Asia

References

External links
 

Mass media companies of Singapore
Mass media companies of Hong Kong
Mass media companies of Australia